The Louisiana Office of Juvenile Justice (OJJ) is a cabinet-level Louisiana state agency that provides youth corrections services in the state.

The full official title of the agency is Department of Public Safety and Corrections, Youth Services, Office of Juvenile Justice (DPSC/YS/OJJ). The agency has its headquarters in the first floor of the State Police Building in Baton Rouge.

The agency's current head is E. Dustin Bickham.

History
The Louisiana Department of Public Safety and Corrections previously handled the care of juvenile prisoners. In 2003 the Louisiana Legislature voted to turn the department's juvenile division into a cabinet level agency.

In 2004 the juvenile system separated from the adult system. It was established as the Office of Youth Development (OYD), and it was given its current name by the Louisiana Legislature in 2008.

Beginning with the creation of the OJJ, the agency adopted a model used by the Missouri Division of Youth Services, the youth corrections agency of Missouri. The OJJ worked together with that agency and the Annie E. Casey Foundation.

Institutions

The state operates three secure institutions for boys.
Acadiana Center for Youth (ACY) in Bunkie, La 
The male institutions include:
 Bridge City Center for Youth (BCCY) - Bridge City, unincorporated Jefferson Parish
 Riverside Alternative High School is located at BCCY.
 A. L. Swanson, Sr. Center for Youth (SCY) - Monroe
 Southside Alternative High School is located at SCY.
 There is a branch center, Swanson Center for Youth at Columbia, which opened in 2013 in the former Columbia Community Residential and Employment Services (CCRES) center for disabled persons.
 Acadiana Center for Youth (ACY) - Bunkie
 Acadiana Center for youth opened in March 2019. Opening in phases, the facility is a state-of-the-art therapeutic facility that houses male offenders ages 13–21.

The OJJ uses the Ware Youth Center by contract to house adjudicated secure girls in an "intensive residential" program.

Former institutions
Former male institutions:
 Louis Jetson Center for Youth (JCY) - unincorporated East Baton Rouge Parish, near Baton Rouge and Baker It as previously referred to as "Scotlandville" after the nearby community. The facility closed abruptly in January 2014. All residents were moved to the other secure facilities in the early morning hours.
Tallulah Youth Center

Previously girls were housed in the Florida Parishes Detention Center in Covington, and the Terrebonne Detention Center in Houma.

Non-Secure Programs 
OJJ's philosophy is to match adjudicated youth to programs to meet their needs. Some youth, while not amenable to treatment in the community, are not a risk to public safety or in dire need of treatment in a secure environment. OJJ contracts with community treatment providers in non-secure, residential settings (group homes and therapeutic foster care) to place adjudicated youth into. These group homes are located in various places throughout the state.

Probation/Parole Services 
OJJ is also tasked with the responsibility of providing probation and parole supervision for adjudicated youth throughout the state. There are 11 regional offices located in:

Northern Region:

 Shreveport
 Tallulah
 Monroe

Southeast Region:

 Thibodeaux
 New Orleans
 Hammond
Baton Rouge

Central/Southwest Region:

 Alexandria
 Lake Charles
 Lafayette (which had a satellite office in Opelousas up until 2016, when it closed and consolidated with Lafayette)
 Natchitoches

Probation and Parole Officers are Peace Officers and Standards Training certified (P.O.S.T) and have arresting authority in the state.

References

External links

 Louisiana Office of Juvenile Justice
 Louisiana Office of Youth Development (Archive)
 Ware Youth Center

Government of Louisiana
juvenile
Juvenile detention centers in the United States
Louisiana
2004 establishments in Louisiana
Government agencies established in 2004